Calling Sehmat is the 2008 spy thriller novel written by Harinder S. Sikka based on real events. It was Sikka's debut novel, first published by Konark publishers in April 2008. A revised edition was subsequently published by Penguin Random House India in May 2018.

Plot
The story is set in India and Pakistan of 1971 and revolves around Sehmat Khan who is born to a Kashmiri Muslim father and a Punjabi Hindu mother. Sehmat is a young college-going girl when she learns of her freedom-fighter father's impending death from cancer. As a part of his final wishes, her patriotic father convinces Sehmat to marry a Pakistani army officer, the son of his friend who is a high-ranking Pakistani army general himself. His intention is to place Sehmat as an undercover operative within the Pakistani army household.

Before the actual ceremony, she is hastily provided spy training by members of the Indian intelligence organization RAW. After marriage, Sehmat not only manages to gain confidence of her new family and their friends, but also starts to gather vital information that she passes on to her handlers. Eventually she comes across plans, what appear to be, to sink a key Indian naval target using a submarine.

They are able to provide an early warning to the Indian Navy which proves vital towards India's war effort. Towards the end, Sehmat is discovered but manages to escape with the help of her handlers. She ultimately returns to India, pregnant with her Pakistani husband's child. Her child goes on to grow up and join the Indian Army as an officer himself.

Non-fictional elements 

According to Sikka, he stumbled upon the story during the Kargil conflict. He acquired the story from an Indian army officer who told him of how his mother, a Kashmiri Muslim, had married a Pakistani Army officer to provide India with classified information during the 1971 war. Sikka eventually managed meet the officer's mother in Malerkotla, Punjab where she eventually unfolded further elements of her story. As a part of her duties in Pakistan, she used to tutor General Yahya Khan's grandchildren.

It took Sikka approximately 8 years to fictionalize the story and arrange it into a cohesive narrative. He fictionalized the name of the main character in order to keep her anonymous. During a recent interview, he has said that the real woman behind the character has since died. As a tribute to her, Sikka formally launched the book aboard Vikrant, which was docked at Naval dockyard in Mumbai.

The book was re-published by Penguin India in a new format in March 2018.

Hindi version 

A Hindi version of the book was published on 23 Aug 2019.

Film adaptation

In 2018, the novel was adapted into a Hindi-language spy thriller with change in the ending contrary to the book titled Raazi. It starred Alia Bhatt in the role of Sehmat and Vicky Kaushal in that of her husband. The film was directed by Meghna Gulzar and produced by Vineet Jain, Karan Johar, Hiroo Yash Johar and Apoorva Mehta under the banner of Dharma Productions.

See also 
 Indo-Pakistani War of 1971
 Indo-Pakistani wars and conflicts

References

External links

Calling Sehmat at Penguin India

English-language books
Spy novels
Indian novels adapted into films
India–Pakistan relations in popular culture
Research and Analysis Wing in fiction
2008 Indian novels
Military of Pakistan in fiction
Indian thriller novels
Novels set in Pakistan